Victor Sarusi is an Israeli former footballer.

Honours
Israeli Premier League (1):
1973–74

References

1945 births
Living people
Israeli Jews
Israeli footballers
Maccabi Netanya F.C. players
Beitar Jerusalem F.C. players
Hapoel Hadera F.C. players
Hapoel Be'er Sheva F.C. players
Hapoel Petah Tikva F.C. players
Footballers from Netanya
Israeli people of Moroccan-Jewish descent
Association footballers not categorized by position
Israel international footballers